Neshaminy is an unincorporated community in Warrington Township in Bucks County, Pennsylvania, United States. Neshaminy is located at the intersection of Pennsylvania Route 611 and Pennsylvania Route 132.

References

Unincorporated communities in Bucks County, Pennsylvania
Unincorporated communities in Pennsylvania